Woman Doctor is a 1939 American melodrama film directed by Sidney Salkow and starring Frieda Inescort, Henry Wilcoxon, and Claire Dodd. The screenplay was written by Joseph Moncure March, based on a story by Alice Altschuler and Miriam Geiger.  The film opened on February 6, 1939.

Cast list
 Frieda Inescort as Dr. Judith Randall
 Henry Wilcoxon as Allan Graeme
 Claire Dodd as Gail Patterson
 Sybil Jason as Elsa Graeme
 Cora Witherspoon as Fanny
 Frank Reicher as Dr. Mathews
 Gus Glassmire as Dr. Martin
 Dickie Jones as Johnny
 Joan Howard as Louise
 Spencer Charters as Veterinarian
 Virginia Brissac as Miss Crenshaw
 Rex as Moxie

References

External links
 
 
 

Republic Pictures films
Films directed by Sidney Salkow
Melodrama films
1939 drama films
1939 films
American drama films
Films produced by Sol C. Siegel
American black-and-white films
1930s American films